Robert, Rob, or Bob Saunders may refer to:
 Robert Saunders (Irish lawyer) (c. 1650–1708), Serjeant-at-law
 Robert Saunders Jr. (1805–1868), American academic and politician
 Robert Alan Saunders, American computer scientist and professor
 Robert Hood Saunders (1903–1955), mayor of Toronto
 Rob Saunders (born 1968), Irish rugby union player
 Bob Saunders (American football), American football coach
 Bob Saunders (baseball) (1902–1983), baseball pitcher in the Negro leagues
 Bob Saunders (politician) (1929–2016), American politician